El Cangri.com is the second studio album by Puerto Rican rapper Daddy Yankee.  It was released in 2002 by V.I. Music. The album was a success in Puerto Rico and the Dominican Republic with songs "Latigazo", "Muévete y Perrea", "¡Dimelo!" and "Ella Esta Soltera". "Latigazo" also received mainstream success in Spanish-language radio stations in Miami and New York City in the United States. According to Yankee himself, he manufactured and distributed the record and sold over 50,000 copies.

Track listing

Charts

References

2002 albums
Daddy Yankee albums